

Women's 200 m Breaststroke - Final

Women's 200 m Breaststroke - Heats

Women's 200 m Breaststroke - Heat 01

Women's 200 m Breaststroke - Heat 02

200 metres breaststroke
2006 in women's swimming